Hypostomus nigropunctatus is a species of catfish in the family Loricariidae. It is native to South America, where it occurs in the Iguazu River in the state of Paraná in Brazil. The species reaches  in standard length and is believed to be a facultative air-breather.

References 

nigropunctatus
Fish described in 2012